Full House is a live album by Australian singer John Farnham. The album was released in Australia on 4 November 1991, and is the first live album by Farnham since his comeback via the 1986 release of Whispering Jack. It peaked at No.2 on the ARIA Albums Chart.

The album contains live tracks recorded during Farnham's 1987 "Whispering Jack Tour," 1989 "Age Of Reason Tour" and the 1990 "Chain Reaction Tour." Only one track from this album was released as a single. "Please Don't Ask Me [Live]" , written by Graeham Goble, of The Little River Band was released in late 1991 and peaked at No. 22 on the ARIA Singles Chart. It had previously been featured on an earlier album Uncovered.

Track listing
 "When the War Is Over" (S. Prestwich) – 5:33
 "Age Of Reason" (T. Hunter, J. Pigott) – 5:35
 "Don't You Know It's Magic" (B. Cadd) – 4:18
 "Two Strong Hearts" (B. Woolley, A. Hill) – 3:49
 "Comic Conversations" (J. Bromley) – 4:05
 "Help!" (J. Lennon, P. McCartney) – 4:57
 "Chain Reaction" (D. Stewart, S. Stewart) – 3:42
 "Burn For You" (P. Buckle, J. Farnham, R. Faser) – 4:20
 "Reasons" (S. See) – 4:25
 "You're the Voice" (M. Ryder, C. Thompson, A. Qunta, K. Reid) – 5:17
 "A Touch of Paradise" (R. Wilson, G. Smith) – 4:42
 "That's Freedom" (T. Kimmel, J. Chapman) – 4:37
 "One" (H. Nilsson) – 3:04
 "Playing To Win" (G. Goble, J. Farnham, D. Hirschfelder, S. Housden, S. Proffer, W. Nelson, S. Prestwich) – 3:07
 "Pressure Down" (H. Bogdanovs) – 3:37
 "Please Don't Ask Me" (G. Goble) – 3:29

Charts

Certifications

References 

John Farnham live albums
1991 live albums